Johann Luif (born 12 July 1959) is an Austrian politician and military officer.
From 22 May 2019 – 3  June 2019 he was the Minister of Defense.

References 

1959 births
Living people
Austrian generals
People from Burgenland
Austrian Ministers of Defence
21st-century Austrian politicians
Theresian Military Academy alumni